Hold Back Your Love may refer to:
 
"Hold Back Your Love", song by Magnum from Vigilante (Magnum album)
"Hold Back Your Love", song by White Lies from  Friends (White Lies album)